Zalesie  is a village in the administrative district of Gmina Milejów, within Łęczna County, Lublin Voivodeship, in eastern Poland.

The village has a population of 115.

References

Villages in Łęczna County